Walker's Point or Walkers Point may refer to:

Australia
 Walkers Point, Queensland, a locality in the Fraser Coast Region
 Walkers Point, Queensland (Bundaberg Region), a town in Woodgate in the Bundaberg Region

United States
Walker's Point, a neighborhood in Milwaukee, Wisconsin
Walker's Point Estate, the Bush compound at Walker's Point in Kennebunkport, Maine
Walker's Point Historic District, a historic district in Milwaukee, Wisconsin
Walker's Point Recreation Area, near Madison, South Dakota